Sergey Piletsky is a Professor of Bioanalytical Chemistry and the Research Director for School of Chemistry, University of Leicester, United Kingdom.

Education 
Sergey graduated from Kiev University, Ukraine, obtaining an MSc in Chemistry in 1985 and researched on synthesis of the polymers selective for nucleic acids, for which he was awarded with a PhD in 1991. Cranfield University awarded Sergey with a DSc for his work on Molecularly imprinted polymers for diagnostics applications.

Awards 
Sergey is a recipient of Royal Society Wolfson Research Merit Award, Leverhulme Trust Fellowship, DFG Fellowship from the Institute of Analytical Chemistry, Award of President of Ukraine, and Japan Society for Promotion of Science and Technology Fellowship.

Research 
Sergey's work in molecular imprinting focuses on: (i) the fundamental study of the recognition properties of molecularly imprinted polymers; (ii) the development of sensors and assays for environmental and clinical analysis; and (iii) the development of molecularly imprinted polymers nanoparticles for theranostic applications.

Sergey introduced computational design into the field of molecular imprinting, by scientifically demonstrating that non-covalent interaction between the template molecule and polymer is through the technique 'bite and switch' where functional groups first non-covalently bond with the binding site, but during the rebinding step, the polymer matrix forms irreversible covalent bonds with the target molecule. A number of research groups around the world follow his idea, for developing functional imprinted polymers for a variety of applications.

Most widely cited journal publications 

 
 
 
 Surface-grafted molecularly imprinted polymers for protein recognition, A Bossi, SA Piletsky, EV Piletska, PG Righetti, APF Turner, Analytical chemistry 73 (21), 5281-5286
 Electrochemical sensor for catechol and dopamine based on a catalytic molecularly imprinted polymer-conducting polymer hybrid recognition element, Dhana Lakshmi, Alessandra Bossi, Michael J Whitcombe, Iva Chianella, Steven A Fowler, Sreenath Subrahmanyam, Elena V Piletska, Sergey A Piletsky, Analytical Chemistry 81 (9), 3576-3584

Most widely cited books and book chapters 

 
 
 
 
 Piletsky S.A., Turner A.P.F. (2006). New generation of chemical sensors based on molecularly imprinted polymers, in: Molecular imprinting of polymers, S. Piletsky and A.P.F. Turner (eds.), Landes Bioscience, Georgetown, TX, USA

Most widely recognized patents 

 Rationally Designed Selective Binding Polymers (2010), Publication number: 20100009859, Inventors: Sergey A. Piletsky, Olena Piletska, Khalku Karim, Coulton H. Legge, Sreenath Subrahmanyam
 Electrochemical Sensor (2019) Publication number: 20210239643, Inventors: Sergey Piletsky, Omar Sheej Ahamad, Alvaro Garcia Cruz
 Polymerisation method, polymers and uses thereof (2006) Publication number: 20060122288, Inventors: Sergey Piletsky, Olena Piletska, Anthony Turner, Khalku Karim, Beining Chen
 Methods and Kits for determining binding sites (2020) Publication number: 20200033356, Inventors: Sergey Piletsky, Elena Piletska, Francesco Canfarotta, Don Jones
 Photoreactor and Process for Preparing MIP Nanoparticles (2014) Publication number: 20140228472, Inventors: Sergey Piletsky, Olena Piletska, Antonio Guerreiro, Michael Whitcombe, Alessandro Poma

References

External links

Year of birth missing (living people)
Living people
British chemists

Alumni of Cranfield University
Molecular modelling
Ukrainian expatriates in England
British inventors